Dance on Sunset is an American dance and music series hosted by Quddus (Benjamin Quddus Philippe) on Nickelodeon that featured dance routines, called the "Fresh-Squeezed Dance", designed to be performed by its preteen and teenage viewers. Choreographer Tony Testa and the show's dance troupe, the Nick 6, demonstrated each routine slowly, repeating it several times during the episode. An "advanced" version of each routine was featured on the show's website. Episodes featured musical guests, which included Akon, Natasha Bedingfield, Miranda Cosgrove, Fall Out Boy, Fergie, Janet Jackson, Sean Kingston, Lil' Mama, Jesse McCartney, Menudo, Omarion, Panic! at the Disco and Ashlee Simpson, as well as dancing by a studio audience. The show premiered on March 29, 2008, immediately after the 2008 Kids' Choice Awards.
The name 'On Sunset' came from the production location Nickelodeon on Sunset on Sunset Boulevard in Hollywood. The show was canceled due to low viewership. The series finale aired on June 21, 2008. The website has been discontinued & shut down as of December 21, 2017.

Dancers
Members of the show's dance troupe, at the time of the show's debut, ranged in age from 15 to 22. They were directed by Tony Testa, a former choreographer of Janet Jackson. The group consisted of Karen Chuang, Johnny Erasme, Ashley Galvan, Shane Harper, Aubree Storm and Hefa Tuita; the group was chosen with an eye for diversity and differing backgrounds.

Karen Chuang
Karen Chuang was born on March 26, 1990, in San Jose, California. She graduated summa cum laude with a B.A. in business economics from UCLA, where she was the executive director for its premiere hip-hop team, NSU Modern. She is now pursuing a career as a professional dancer and is represented by Clear Talent Group. Her credits include Grey's Anatomy, Glee, The White House, The Ellen Show, Willow Smith, Cher Lloyd, and Nicki Minaj's "Pink Friday Reloaded" World Tour (2013). She has danced alongside Lady Gaga at the 2013 MTV VMAs and in her "G.U.Y." music video, and performed with Kanye West on his "Yeezus" Tour (2014). She is also a member of Entity Contemporary Dance Company. Karen's technical background and diverse training create a unique hip-hop-inspired contemporary style, which she enjoys exploring and sharing with fellow dancers. She currently subs regularly at Edge Performing Arts Center in Los Angeles, California, and Movement Lifestyle in North Hollywood, California. In addition to her artistic aspirations, Karen also has a passion for fashion and was an assistant to the PR Coordinator at Versace from 2011 to 2012.

Johnny Erasme
Johnny Erasme was born May 11, 1989, in Fort Lauderdale, Florida. A former member of the JammX Kids, he appeared in the JCPenney commercial "Control Freak." His family moved from New Orleans, Louisiana, to California after Hurricane Katrina. He raps and plays guitar and has released a CD titled "Johnny E.".

Ashley Galvan
Ashley Galvan a high-school senior at the debut of "Dance on Sunset", is from Visalia, California. She started dancing at 3 and is schooled in jazz, ballet, tap, lyrical, contemporary, and modern dance. She received the 2007 Cover Girl Award 2007 for "Spotlight Dance Cup Comp". She has appeared in a Keke Palmer dance video, on the CBS KEWLopolis dancing competition "Dance Revolution" and in commercials and was also a background dancer in the remake of the movie Fame. She even competed on season 7 of So You Think You Can Dance as one of the top 11 contestants. She also made an appearance in the Glee episode "Original Song" as one of the Aural Intensity singers.

Shane Harper
Shane Harper was born on February 14, 1993, in La Jolla, California. He was a principal dancer in the Disney Channel's High School Musical 2, an extra in Nickelodeon's Zoey 101. He's ventured more into acting over the years, most notably as Spencer Walsh on Good Luck Charlie.

Aubree Storm
Aubree Storm born January 4, 1986, is an Elburn, Illinois, native who trained in ballet, jazz, tap and modern dance at St. Charles School of Dance and the Lou Conte Dance Studio of Chicago. She was a dancer in Disney's "High School Musical" concert tour and was a dancer for Ashley Tisdale in appearances on "Good Morning America" and Live with Regis and Kelly, and appeared as a dancer in the film Step Brothers. She was also a member of Jin Akanishi's group of backup dancers, Jincrew, used for his concerts. She has also danced for Willow Smith, Cher Lloyd, and Justin Bieber as one of twelve dancers featured in his Believe Tour.

Hefa Tuita

Tuita was born June 18, 1991, in Spanish Fork, Utah. He was a dancer in the Disney Channel's High School Musical 2 and High School Musical 3: Senior Year appearing in various parts of the movie. He is trained in Latin and salsa dancing as well as hip-hop, jazz, ballroom international and funk. He was trained at Heart N Soul Dance Studio. He appeared in the movie Unaccompanied Minors, danced in two Taylor Vai videos and for Rihanna. He's danced with multiple recording artists including Jennifer Lopez, Janet Jackson, Usher, Kylie Minogue, and Chris Brown.

Episodes
Episodes broadcast have included the following. Each features a playlist of five songs and usually includes at least one special guest. Each also features a new "Fresh-Squeezed Dance."

International distribution
 Premiered in Australia and New Zealand on April 13, 2008 on Nickelodeon.
 Premiered in Canada on YTV on May 18, 2008, at 8:00 P.M. ET after the 2008 Kids' Choice Awards.
 Premiered in South East Asia on March 9, 2009 on Nickelodeon South East Asia part of Nick at Nite.

References

External links

 
 Nick busts a move with 'Dance on Sunset'
 

2000s American music television series
2000s American reality television series
2008 American television series debuts
2008 American television series endings
2000s Nickelodeon original programming
Dance television shows
English-language television shows
Television series about teenagers